From a Roman Balcony (also known as Pickup in Rome and The Crazy Day) is a 1960 drama film directed by Mauro Bolognini.  It is a co-production between Italy (where it was released as La giornata balorda) and France (where it is known as Ça s'est passé à Rome).

The film is based on several tales by Alberto Moravia, who collaborated on the screenplay. The Italian theatrical release suffered several censorship problems, including the blocking of screenings, and a criminal complaint against director Bolognini and screenwriters Moravia and Pier Paolo Pasolini.

The film was released on an Italian Region 2 DVD by A&R Productions in April 2014.

Cast 
 Jean Sorel as Davide
 Lea Massari as Freya 
 Jeanne Valérie as Marina 
 Rik Battaglia as Carpiti 
 Valeria Ciangottini as Ivana 
 Isabelle Corey as Sabina 
 Paolo Stoppa as Moglie, book-keeper

Censorship 
When La Giornata Balorda was first released in Italy in 1960 the Committee for the Theatrical Review of the Italian Ministry of Cultural Heritage and Activities rated it as VM16: not suitable for children under 16. In addition, the committee imposed the following scenes will be deleted: 1) the scene in which Davide and Marina hug each other in the room where the dead body lies (reel 4); 2) the scene on the terrace, in which Marina offers herself to David taking off her shirt (reel 5); 3) the scene in the woods, in which David and Freja lie on the ground and he starts undressing; 4) The scene where they remain lying next to each other after sexual intercourse must be shortened; 5) in the song the following sentence must be deleted: "... if your mother is a prostitute you are the daughter of a bitch... (page 8)"; 6) the following sentences must be deleted: Freja: "... you like women of your same age or prostitutes?", Davide: "... well, after I paid the prostitutes, how am I going to find the other women... usually prostitutes (page 74)." Document N° 32986 signed on 14 October 1960 by Minister Renzo Helfer.

References

External links

From a Roman Balcony at Variety Distribution

1961 films
Italian drama films
Films based on works by Alberto Moravia
Films directed by Mauro Bolognini
French drama films
1961 drama films
Films scored by Piero Piccioni
1960s Italian films
1960s French films